Get Cracking is a 1943 British comedy war film, directed by Marcel Varnel starring George Formby, with Dinah Sheridan and Ronald Shiner. It was produced by Marcel Varnel and Ben Henry for Columbia (British) Productions, a subsidiary of the American studio. The film opens like a World War Two documentary with a narrator explaining the action, before becoming a more traditional Formby vehicle.

Synopsis
Mechanic and Home Guard lance corporal George Singleton (Formby) has an adversary in a fellow Home Guard, Everett Manley (Shiner). When the rival Home Guard units of Major Wallop and Minor Wallop are sent on battle manoeuvres, George launches his own unique style of commando raid against neighbouring Major Wallop to steal a Vickers machine gun. The raid fails and Singleton loses his lance corporal stripe, so he and a little evacuee girl named Irene decide to build their very own tank. The venture is such a success that George is made a sergeant.

The film includes three songs from Formby: 'Under the Blasted Oak', 'Home Guard Blues' and 'Get Cracking'.

Production
The film was released on 17 May 1943 and runs for 96 minutes in black and white. It was written by L. du Garde Peach, Michael Vaughan and John L. Arthur, while the songs were written by George Formby with Fred Godfrey, Fred E. Cliffe and Eddie Latta.

Cast list
 George Formby as George Singleton -
 Dinah Sheridan as Mary Pemberton 
 Edward Rigby as Sam Elliott
 Frank Pettingell as Alf Pemberton
 Ronald Shiner as Everett Manley
 Wally Patch as Sergeant Joe Preston
 Mike Johnson as Josh
 Irene Handl as Maggie Turner
 Vera Frances as Irene
 Frank Atkinson as Station Master
 Ben Williams as Home Guard
 Harry Fowler (Uncredited)
 E. V. H. Emmett as Narrator

References

External links
 
 
 

1943 films
1940s war comedy films
British black-and-white films
British war comedy films
1940s English-language films
Films directed by Marcel Varnel
Films produced by Marcel Varnel
Columbia Pictures films
British World War II propaganda films
1943 comedy films